Olearia arida is a species of flowering plant in the family Asteraceae and is endemic to inland western Australia. It is upright shrub with spreading branches and clusters of white flowers.

Description
The upper-side of leaves are smooth and sticky, the under-side a woolly white with an obvious mid-vein with a rolled edge and glands. The cluster of 10-15 white flowers are on a short stem in leaf axils. The flower centre is yellow, blooms appear from  July to September.

Taxonomy and naming
Olearia arida was described in 1918 by Ernst Pritzel and published in Repertorium Specierum Novarum Regni Vegetabilis. The specific epithet (arida) is derived from the Latin word aridus meaning "dry".

Distribution and habitat
This species grows on sand hills in the Coolgardie, Great Victoria Desert and Murchison biogeographic regions of Western Australia, in the far north-west of South Australia and the far south-west of the Northern Territory.

Conservation status
This daisy is listed as "Priority Four" in Western Australia, by the Government of Western Australia Department of Biodiversity, Conservation and Attractions, meaning that it is rare or near threatened.

References

Flora of Western Australia
alpicola
Flora of South Australia
Flora of the Northern Territory
Taxa named by Ernst Pritzel
Plants described in 1918